Anakkara C. Koyakutty Musliyar was a Sunni religious scholar from the state of Kerala, India. He was the 9th president of the EK faction of Samastha (30 October 2012 – 3 May 2016). He was elected after the death of former president Kalambadi Muhammad Musliyar in October 2012. Musliyar died on 3 May 2016.

References 

People from Palakkad district
Date of birth missing
Indian Sunni Muslim scholars of Islam
1934 births
Kerala Sunni-Shafi'i scholars
2016 deaths